Dayton Lummis (August 8, 1903 – March 23, 1988) was an American film, television and theatre actor. He was perhaps best known for playing the role of General Douglas MacArthur in the 1955 film The Court-Martial of Billy Mitchell. Lummis died in March 1988 in Santa Monica, California, at the age of 84.

Partial filmography 

Red Planet Mars (1952) - Radio Commentator (uncredited)
The Winning Team (1952) - Graham Mcnamee (uncredited)
Breakdown (1952) - Prison Warden (uncredited)
Les Misérables (1952) - Defense Lawyer (uncredited)
Something for the Birds (1952) - Speaker of the House (uncredited)
Operation Secret (1952) - French Radio Broadcaster (Voice, uncredited)
Bloodhounds of Broadway (1952) - Chairman (uncredited)
Because of You (1952) - Philip Arnold (uncredited)
Ruby Gentry (1952) - Ruby's Attorney (uncredited)
The Mississippi Gambler (1953) - John Sanford (uncredited)
Tangier Incident (1953) - Henry Morrison
Man in the Dark (1953) - Dr. Marston
Port Sinister (1953) - Mr. Lennox
Julius Caesar (1953) - Messala
The President's Lady (1953) - Dr. May (uncredited)
All I Desire (1953) - Col. Underwood
The Golden Blade (1953) - Munkar (uncredited)
China Venture (1953) - Dr. Masterson
How to Marry a Millionaire (1953) - Justice of the Peace (uncredited)
The Glenn Miller Story  (1954) - Col. Spaulding, USAAF (uncredited)
Dragon's Gold (1954) - Donald McCutcheon
Loophole (1954) - Jim Starling
Princess of the Nile (1954) - Prince Selim (uncredited)
Demetrius and the Gladiators (1954) - Magistrate (uncredited)
The Caine Mutiny (1954) - Uncle Lloyd (uncredited)
20,000 Leagues Under the Sea (1954) - Reporter from The Bulletin (uncredited)
Return to Treasure Island (1954) - Capt. Flint
The Yellow Mountain (1954) - Geraghty
Prince of Players (1955) - English Doctor
The Prodigal (1955) - Caleb
A Man Called Peter (1955) - Scottish Police Constable (uncredited)
The Cobweb (1955) - Dr. Tim Carmody (uncredited)
My Sister Eileen (1955) - Mr. Wallace (uncredited)
The View from Pompey's Head (1955) - Charles Barlowe
Sudden Danger (1955) - Raymond Wilkins
The Spoilers (1955) - Wheaton
The Court-Martial of Billy Mitchell (1955) - General Douglas MacArthur
High Society (1956) - H. Stuyvesant Jones
Over-Exposed (1956) - Horace Sutherland
The First Texan (1956) - Stephen Austin
The Bad Seed (1956) - The Doctor (uncredited)
Showdown at Abilene (1956) - Jack Bedford
The Wrong Man (1956) - Judge Groat
Monkey on My Back (1957) - J.L. McAvoy
From Hell to Texas (1958) - Padre (uncredited)
Compulsion (1959) - Dr. Allwyn - Psychiatrist (uncredited)
Elmer Gantry (1960) - Eddington
The Music Box Kid (1960) - Father Gorman
Spartacus (1960) - Symmachus (uncredited)
The Flight That Disappeared (1961) - Dr. Carl Morris
Deadly Duo (1962) - Thorne Fletcher
Jack the Giant Killer (1962) - King Mark
Beauty and the Beast (1962) - Roderick
Mooncussers (1962) - Commissioner
Papa's Delicate Condition (1963) - Doctor (uncredited)
Moonfire (1970) - Fuentes

References

External links 

Rotten Tomatoes profile

1903 births
1988 deaths
People from Summit, New Jersey
Male actors from New Jersey
American male film actors
American male television actors
American male stage actors
20th-century American male actors
Western (genre) television actors